A Letzi (plural: Letzinen, also known in German as a Talsperre in the sense of a fortification, not a dam) or Letzimauer refers to defensive barriers whose purpose is to protect the entrance into a valley. The term is Swiss, and such stone barriers were particularly common in medieval Switzerland but were also built in Austria and Germany.

Location 
Letzis usually consisted of:
 hill castles on the valley sides or on heights either side of the valley
 defensive walls, often in combination with other bastions, running transversely across the valley in order to seal it completely. Because these parts of the position were typically unable to use the advantage of height, they had some of the character of lowland castles.
Because they had a combination of elements of hill and lowland castles, letzis did not fall neatly into either category.

The walls were often several kilometres long, for example in Rothenthurm SZ, and were often combined with ditches.

Such defensive valley barriers were still being built in the 19th century, for example the Forte della Chiusa and Buco di Vela.

Purpose 
Researchers have not been united in all respects about whether these fortifications actually served as protective lines of defence or whether, in most cases, they were just intended as border marcations and defence against cattle thieves.

What is certain is the Letzis were used to force merchants to adhere to specified routes (Straßenzwang) and thus to enable the collection of customs duties (Wegzoll) and money to pay for the maintenance of the roads.

Examples with hill castles 
 Castles of Bellinzona, Ticino
 Castelmur Castle, Grisons
 Ehrenberg Castle, Tyrol
 Fernstein Castle, Tyrol
 Fracstein Castle, Grisons
 Klamm Castle (Lower Austria) above Schottwien
 Mauterndorf Castle, Salzburg
 Schlossberg Castle (Seefeld in Tirol)
 Castle ruins in the Mühlbacher Klause, South Tyrol
 Hohenwerfen Fortress, Salzburg
 Fortini della Fame, Ticino
 Karlsfried, Saxony
 La Serra, Zernez, Grisons
 Letzi and ruins of Mülenen Castle, Berne
 Serravalle, Ticino
 Schloß-Nauses Castle, Hesse

Free-standing examples 
 Hadnmauer (a letzi near Rattendorf in the Gailtal valley, which presumably guarded Gurina)
 Landmauer Gamsen, Wallis
 Letzis of Arth and Oberarth, Schwyz
 Letzimauer in Näfels, Glarus
 Letzimauer in Rothenthurm, Schwyz
 Letzi Tower, Basel
 Letzi Tower in Morgarten, Schwyz
 Porta Claudia, Tyrol
 Türkenschanze, Carinthia
 Hardturm, Zurich

Name 
The Swiss German word, Letzi, comes from the Middle High German "letze", i. e. a barrier, obstacle, defensive wall or border fortification. Even today many toponyms include the words Letzinen, Letzimauern or Letzitürme. Remains of such defensive fortifications may still be seen in many places today.

Examples of Letzi in place names:
 Letzigasse in Zofingen
 Letzigraben and Letzistrasse in Zürich
 Letzigrund Stadium in Zürich

References

External links 

 
 Neue Zürcher Zeitung (14 July 2012): Eine chinesische Mauer in Schwyz?

 
Castles by type
Walls
Medieval defences